Key & Peele (abbreviated to K&P) is an American sketch comedy television series created by Keegan-Michael Key and Jordan Peele for  Comedy Central. Both Key and Peele previously worked on Mad TV.

Each episode of the show consists mainly of several pre-taped skits starring the two actors. The sketches cover a variety of societal topics, often with a focus on American popular culture, ethnic stereotypes, social awkwardness and race relations. Key & Peele premiered on January 31, 2012 and ended on September 9, 2015, with a total of 53 episodes, over the course of five seasons. A special titled "Key & Peele's Super Bowl Special" aired on January 30, 2015.

Key & Peele won a Peabody Award and two Primetime Emmy Awards and has been nominated for various other awards, including Writers Guild Award, NAACP Image Award and 16 additional Primetime Emmy Awards in various categories.

Comedy Central also maintains an official YouTube channel for the series, which currently has over 4 million subscribers and 1.80 billion views, as of August 2022.

Format
In the first three seasons, an episode would consist of a cold opening, with a short sketch. After the intro plays, the two hosts would introduce themselves to a studio audience and explain a possible situation, with the following sketch having a similar situation. The show then follows this pattern, with a number of sketches, each varying in time. However, not all the segments are introduced by a studio segment nor are they necessarily on the same, a similar or connected theme. Many of the show's sketches follow a similar comedic form, specifically taking a comedic premise, situation, or turn of phrase, and repeating it in a more extreme fashion, thereby 'upping the ante' of comedic absurdity as the sketch unfolds. As an example, in popular sketch "Consequences", a guest speaker is brought to a school assembly to warn students about the  consequences of their youthful misadventures. The  speaker starts by telling a story of pattern of youthful misbehaviors and minor substance-use, such as smoking cigarettes and "hanging out on the street late at night" leading to misdemeanors and petty crime, through to "real crimes" which resulted in "being shot out of a catapult into the mouth of a dragon", and later being "sucked into a wormhole, consequences!". Additionally, Key and Peele's sketches often poke fun at aspects of race relations in the modern-day US, as well African American culture writ large, in particular distinctive names associated with current Black American culture. One of Key and Peele's most popular sketches is the  "East vs. West Bowl" Series, which combines the  aforementioned increase in absurdity sketch format and combines it with distinctive (and humorous) names of the characters in the sketches."

In the last two seasons, the show eschewed a studio audience in favor of a pre-shot narrative, featuring the duo discussing a concept during a car ride, as the introduction to their sketches.

Production
The series was first announced in June 2011 by Comedy Central. In anticipation of the show, Key and Peele launched a web series in support of the program. The series premiered in January 2012 on Comedy Central in the U.S. and on The Comedy Network in Canada. The first episode drew 2.1 million viewers, making it the most-watched Comedy Central launch since 2009. The series was renewed for four more seasons, beginning in September 2012, September 2013, September 2014, and July 2015. The last episode aired in September 2015.

Episodes

Recurring characters and sketches

 Barack Obama and  – The 44th President of the United States, played by Peele, often has difficulty expressing his true feelings, and President Obama's "anger translator" Luther, played by Key, works to interpret the President's low-key statements into raging tirades. One sketch reveals that Obama's wife and daughters each have their own anger translators as well, whom they request help from to speak with each other. Key appeared briefly in-character as Luther at the Annual White House Correspondents Dinner as an anger translator for the real Barack Obama in early 2015. On January 5, 2017, Key debuted an "Obama-Luther" sketch on The Daily Show with Trevor Noah.
 Wendell Sanders – Played by Peele, Wendell is a nerdy, extremely overweight, friendless man who loves sci-fi and fantasy. He often comes up with elaborate stories to convince others (especially over the phone) that he is not a stereotypical nerd, and that he is calling on the behalf of people other than himself. This includes a very attractive woman named "Claire", with whom he claims to have a relationship, and the 15-year-old son named "Stimpy" they have. (He was put on the spot when questioned about his nonexistent son, and he was close to a plush doll of the character from The Ren & Stimpy Show.) Though his stories are obvious lies, they are elaborate enough that he usually manages to convince the person on the other end of the phone line (usually a gullible man played by Key) that the people in his stories exist. When asked to speak with his fabricated friends and family, Wendell makes up an abrupt event on the spot (usually involving the fabricated person in question being killed) to prevent the person he is talking to from piecing together that his stories are lies, and to end the conversation.
 Mr. Garvey – Played by Key, Mr. Garvey is an angry and intimidating substitute teacher and 20-year veteran of urban education. He distrusts (he refuses to allow students to leave for club photos, as he believes that it is a made-up excuse to leave class, even after a schoolwide announcement over the intercom, which he also believes to be fake) and has trouble pronouncing the common names of his mild-mannered and generally white suburban students, though he vehemently believes his pronunciations are correct, such as pronouncing the name Jacqueline as "Jay-kwellin" or Blake as "Balakay" or Denise as "Dee-Nice" and his most known Aaron as "A. A. Ron". Any corrections from the students are seen as highly disrespectful lies meant to make him look foolish. Mr. Garvey forces his students to acknowledge themselves by his incorrect pronunciations, often at the very real threat of being sent to Principal O'Shaughnessy (pronounced "O-Shag-Hennessy" by Garvey) for disrespect. The only student Mr. Garvey seems to trust is an African American boy at the back of the class named Timothy (accent on the "o") (played by Peele), who is implied to be from the inner city and claims to have a daughter. In March 2015, it was announced that Key will reprise the role of Mr. Garvey in a feature-length film Substitute Teacher with Peele portraying a rival teacher. In November 2022, Key reprised the role in an advertisement for Paramount+.
  – Played by Peele, Meegan is a young woman angry at her boyfriend, André, who always pursues her from a club, but she won't let him near enough to make up. The distance they cover in their pursuit becomes extreme. Meegan is shown to be extremely selfish and unintelligent, and does not seem to acknowledge social norms. She herself rarely ever receives any sort of comeuppance for the flagrant disrespect she shows to others. When not with André, Meegan is often seen with another woman who acts exactly like her (played by Key), and they often gossip between one other about being shocked by people doing normal acts, and calling them "crazy". They also take many selfies of themselves, but delete the majority of them because they don't like how they look in them, including a picture that had already just been classified as evidence in a crime that they witnessed.
 – Played by Key, André is Meegan's equally loud, but far more intelligent and polite boyfriend who tends to take the fall for the conflicts she starts with others.
 DeVon – Played by Key, DeVon is the shady and weird landlord who's often suspicious of what goes on in his tenants' apartments.
 Rafi Benitez – Played by Peele, Rafi is a baseball player who makes all his teammates uncomfortable in the locker room, because of his "slap-ass" addiction.
 Brock Favors – Played by Key, Brock Favors is a news reporter who's always ill-prepared for his assignments such as helicopter traffic reports and reporting on police dog training. He always responds to unexpected and sudden events with loud, excited swearing.
 Col. Hans Muller – A Nazi colonel who is ignorant to the truth. He uses "very scientific" methods to find black people (offering them beets, measuring their heads, jingling cat toys). He is played by recurring guest star Ty Burrell.
 Levi and Cedric – Two inner-city friends who often get in rifts because of Levi (Peele) constantly joining new trends such as going steam-punk or getting his own Ratatouille. Most sketches end with Cedric (Key) getting fed up with Levi and calling off their friendship.
 Carlito – Played by Peele, Carlito is a Mexican gangster who believes that very normal or minor acts (including sitting in chairs) are "for pussies", and believes himself to be above doing such acts. He believes himself to be "the crazy one" of the gang, which he will go to embarrassing lengths to prove.
 The Valets – Two valets from the Berkshire Restaurant (who always use unnecessary plurals in names of people, places, or things) who love discussing their favorite movie stars and characters – despite mangling their names and films – such as "Liam Neesons" from Tooken, "Peter Dinkels" (who plays "Taiwan Lannister"), "Bruce Willies," "Michelle Pa-feiffers," "Timothy Elephants" and "Racist-Ass Melly Gibsons". They end the sketch by saying that something related to the star in question is "MY SHIT!", then disappearing, by ways such as flying into the air like a rocket or exploding. In February 2014, a sponsored sketch with the valets titled "What About Non-Stop?" – in which "Liam Neesons" himself shows up to collect his car – was used to promote the film Non-Stop. Key and Peele also appeared in a parody of "The Valets" in one of the teaser trailers for Toy Story 4.
 Karim and Jahar – Two lecherous Middle Eastern men on the lookout for beautiful women. Though they claim to dislike gay people, they often act in a flamboyantly feminine manner.
 LaShawn and Samuel – A gay couple with very differing personalities and views on marriage. Samuel (Key) is very intelligent and well-mannered and exercises restraint when making important decisions. LaShawn (Peele) is very loud and extremely flamboyant and is constantly thinking up often nonsensical and impossible ideas for their future.
  Football Players – A series of college football players (most of them played by Key and Peele) whose names become increasingly ridiculous as the list progresses, such as "Donkey Teeth", "Hingle McCringleberry", "Huka'lakanaka Hakanakaheekalucka'hukahakafaka", "Squeeeeeeeps", "Eqqsquizitine Buble-Schwinslow", and "Firstname Lastname". The West Team also features players from non-university organizations (such as "Nevada State – Penitentiary" and "Army – Navy Surplus Store"); the last player for the West Team is always a white player with a bland, stereotypically "Anglo" name and not played by Key nor Peele. In the third edition of this sketch, the fictional athletes were joined by actual players with unusual names (such as Ha Ha Clinton-Dix and Ishmaa'ily Kitchen); the last player for the West team was played by "A.A. Ron Rodgers", in reference to the Mr. Garvey sketches.
 Metta World News – NBA player Metta World Peace delivers the "news," which usually takes the form of presenting bizarre hypothetical scenarios to the audience and his imagined approach to them. This is the only recurring sketch that stars neither Key nor Peele.
 The Black Republicans – A group of outside-of-the-box thinking black men (one member is played by recurring guest star Malcolm-Jamal Warner) who try to convert other black voters to join the Republican party. They are all shown to be similarly dressed in outdated fashion styles such as leather jackets, braided belts, dad jeans, and wire-rimmed glasses. Their catchphrase is "I am pissed, ROYALLY pissed!"
Joseph – Played by Key, Joseph is a crude con man who fabricates facetious hardships so he can deceive others into helping him out.
Dr. Rajeev Gupta – Played by Key, Dr. Gupta is an Indian-American doctor who works at a large hospital.
The Continental – Played by Peele, a strange, eccentric man who opulently and hedonistically indulges in his hotel's free continental breakfast as well as flying first-class. It is unknown if he has immortality, stuck in purgatory, or just very strange.
Rhinos - The name of sports teams of varying sport, often bearing unusually odd-acting team members. Rafi is a member of the baseball team Rhinos.
Power Falcons - Often portrayed as a rival to the Rhinos. The Power Falcons is also the name of a fictional team of superheroes in an implied reference to Power Rangers, two members of which are played by Key and Peele.

Guest stars

 Tatyana Ali
 Utkarsh Ambudkar
 K. D. Aubert
 Sarah Baker
 Malcolm Barrett
 Tone Bell
 Matt Besser
 Jordan Black
 Wayne Brady
 Paget Brewster
 Bo Burnham
 Ty Burrell
 Kate Burton
 Michelle Buteau
 Anna Camp
 Larry Joe Campbell
 Mekia Cox
 Rob Delaney
 Julia Duffy
 Neil Flynn
 Daniele Gaither
 David Giuntoli
 Fiona Gubelmann
 Regina Hall
 Colin Hanks
 Ryan Hansen
 Tricia Helfer
 Justin Hires
 Meagan Holder
 James Hong
 Anna Maria Horsford
 Clint Howard
 Ernie Hudson
 Rob Huebel
 Gabriel Iglesias
 Nicole Randall Johnson
 Matt Jones
 Rashida Jones
 King Bach
 Art LaFleur
 Lauren Lapkus
 Natasha Leggero
 Tiny Lister
 Kristanna Loken
 Melanie Lynskey
 Hayes MacArthur
 Romany Malco
 Ken Marino
 Alphonso McAuley
 Jack McBrayer
 Kate Micucci
 Jerry Minor
 Mark Moses
 Arden Myrin
 Danielle Nicolet
 Dean Norris
 Adam Pally
 Keke Palmer
 Metta World Peace
 Mekhi Phifer
 Lance Reddick
 Retta
 Kim Rhodes
 Rob Riggle
 Jason Ritter
 Charlie Robinson
 Rebecca Romijn
 Andre Royo
 Will Sasso
 Richard Schiff
 Jason Schwartzman
 Brenda Song
 Kevin Sorbo
 Paul F. Tompkins
 Malcolm-Jamal Warner
 Michaela Watkins
 Vernee Watson
 Stephnie Weir
 Billy Dee Williams
 Gary Anthony Williams
 Tyler James Williams
 Cedric Yarbrough
 Carlson Young

Reception

Critical

The first two seasons of Key & Peele received positive reviews, maintaining a score 74 of 100 by the review aggregator site Metacritic. The third season of Key & Peele received critical acclaim, receiving a score of 82 on Metacritic. The series won a Peabody Award in 2013 "for its stars and their creative team's inspired satirical riffs on our racially divided and racially conjoined culture". On April 24, 2012, during an interview on Late Night with Jimmy Fallon, President Barack Obama told the story of how he had watched the Key & Peele sketch on himself with 'Luther, his Anger Translator,' saying that "It's pretty good stuff – It's good stuff." Additionally, on April 25, 2015, during the White House Correspondents Dinner, Key reprised the role of Luther, President Obama's anger translator during the event. Dave Chappelle has accused the show of copying the format he established years prior for Chappelle's Show, but states that he is still a fan of the show.

Awards and nominations

Extras

Vandaveon and Mike
Key & Peele have also created a YouTube commentary of their episodes under their alter-egos Vandaveon Huggins and Mike Taylor. Vandaveon and Mike analyze an episode, and suggest that low brow humor would make it funnier. These videos were also added to On Demand offerings of Key & Peele episodes. On March 12, 2014, Comedy Central announced the network was developing an animated spinoff starring Vandaveon and Mike as 12-year-old hall monitors, in association with Key and Peele.

Home media
On September 25, 2012, Comedy Central and Paramount Home Entertainment released "Key and Peele – Season 1" on DVD and Blu-ray Disc. Both formats feature bloopers, outtakes, a "Poolside Interview," audio commentary with Keegan-Michael Key and Jordan Peele, "Backstage," "Split Their Pants," Key & Peele live at the South Beach Comedy Festival, and an easter egg of the show's theme song.

Broadcast
Key & Peele airs reruns frequently on Comedy Central and VH1.

The show 
generally airs on international localized versions of Comedy Central. It premiered in Australia on The Comedy Channel on August 9, 2012.

References

External links
 
 
 

2010s American black television series
2010s American satirical television series
2010s American sketch comedy television series
2012 American television series debuts
2015 American television series endings
Comedy Central original programming
Cultural depictions of Barack Obama
English-language television shows
Peabody Award-winning television programs
Primetime Emmy Award-winning television series
American comedy duos
Television series created by Jordan Peele
Television series created by Keegan-Michael Key